The AOCs for Languedoc-Roussillon wine include:

Eastern Languedoc
Berlou – Red wines
Clairette de Bellegarde (fr)
Clairette de Languedoc
Coteaux du Languedoc – Red wine, White wine, Rosé
Coteaux du Languedoc Pic Saint Loup
Costières de Nîmes – Red wine. According to some sources, this appellation is now considered a part of Rhône rather than Languedoc.
Faugères – Red wine
Muscat de Frontignan – White wine, Fortified wine
Muscat de Lunel
Muscat de Mireval
Roquebrun – Red wines
Saint-Chinian – Red, White and Rosé wines

Western Languedoc

Cabardès – Red wine, Rosé wine
Côtes de Malepère – Red wine
Corbières – Red wine
Coteaux du Languedoc
Fitou – Red wine
La Clape
Limoux AOC – White wine, Sparkling wine
Minervois – Red wine
Minervois La Liviniere – Red wine
Muscat de St-Jean-de-Minervois – White wine, Fortified wine
Rivesaltes

Roussillon
Banyuls Grand Cru – Red wine, Fortified wine
Banyuls – Red wine, Fortified wine
Collioure – White wine, Red wine
Côtes du Roussillon
 Côtes du Roussillon Les Aspres
Côtes du Roussillon-Villages – Red wine
 Côtes du Roussillon-Villages Caramany
 Côtes du Roussillon-Villages Lesquerde
 Côtes du Roussillon-Villages Latour de France
 Côtes du Roussillon-Villages Tautavel
Maury – White wine, Red wine
Muscat de Rivesaltes – White wine, Fortified wine
Rivesaltes – White wine, Red wine

Indication Géographique Protégée
Some of these wines were referred to as Vins de Pays prior to 2009.

Bessan
Bérange
Cassan
Catalan wine
Caux
Cessnon
Cévennes
Côtes Catalanes
Côtes de Lastours
Côtes de Pérignan
Côtes de Prouille
Côtes de Thau
Côtes de Thongue
Côtes du Céressou
Côtes du Vidourle
Côtes du Brian
Collines de la Moure
Coteau du Libron
Coteaux d'Enserune
Coteaux de Béssilles
Coteaux de Cèze
Coteaux de Fenouillèdes
Coteaux de Fontcaude
Coteaux de la Cabrerisse
Coteaux de Laurens
Coyeaux de Miramount
Coteaux de Murviel
Coteaux de Narbonne
Coteaux de Peyriac
Coteaux du Littoral Audois
Coteaux du Pont du Gard
Coteaux du Salagou
Coteaux Flaviens
Duché d'Uzès
Gorges de l'Hérault
Hauterive
Hauts-de-Badens
L'Ardailbou
La Bénovie
La Cite de Carcassonne
La Côte Vermeille
La Haude Vallée de l'Aude
La Haute Vallée de l'Orb
La Vallée du Paradis
La Vaunage
La Vicomté d'Aumelas
La Vistrenque
Mont-Baudile
Monts de la Grage
Pays du Torgan
Petite Crau
Pézenas
Principauté d'Orange
Sables du Golfe du Lion
Val de Cesse
Val de Dagne
Val de Montferrand
Vals d'Agly

See also
 Languedoc wine
 List of wine producing regions
 Polyphenols in wine
 Varietal
 Wine accessory
 Wine grapes

Languedoc-Roussillon wine AOCs